Everardia is a genus of flowering plants belonging to the family Cyperaceae.

Its native range is tropical South America. It is found in the countries of Brazil, Colombia, Guyana, Peru, Suriname and Venezuela.

The genus name of Everardia is in honour of Everard im Thurn (1852–1932), author, explorer, botanist, photographer and British colonial administrator, and it was first described and published in Timehri Vol.5 on page 210 in 1886.

Known species:
Everardia angusta 
Everardia debilis 
Everardia diffusa 
Everardia disticha 
Everardia erectolaxa 
Everardia flexifolia 
Everardia longifolia 
Everardia maguireana 
Everardia montana 
Everardia recurvigluma 
Everardia spongiosa 
Everardia vareschii

References

Cyperaceae
Cyperaceae genera
Plants described in 1886
Flora of South America